Calculator Applications is one of several academic events sanctioned by the University Interscholastic League (UIL) in Texas, USA. It is also a competition held by the Texas Math and Science Coaches Association, using the same rules as the UIL.

Calculator Applications is designed to test students' abilities to use general calculator functions.

Calculator Applications replaced the Slide Rule contest previously held by UIL.

Eligibility 
Students in Grade 6 through Grade 12 are eligible to enter this event. For competition purposes, separate divisions are held for Grades 6-8 and Grades 9-12, with separate subjects covered on each test as follows:
The test for Grades 6-8 covers addition, subtraction, multiplication, division, roots, and powers, including straightforward calculation problems and simple geometric and stated problems similar to those found in state textbooks.
The test for Grades 9-12 covers the subjects under Grades 6-8 plus exponentiation, logarithms, trigonometric functions, inverse trigonometric functions, iterative solutions for transcendental equations, differential and integral calculus, elementary statistics and matrix algebra.

For Grades 6-8, each school may send up to three students. To participate in team competition, schools must send three students.

For Grades 9-12 each school may send up to four students; however, in districts with more than eight schools the district executive committee can limit participation to three students per school. For a school to participate in team competition, the school must send at least three students.

Rules and scoring 
The test consists of 80 questions at the elementary and junior high levels (the number is not specified for the high school level but usually consists of 70 questions), which the student must complete in only 30 minutes. Judges give no intermediate time signal—at the end of 30 minutes, students must immediately stop calculator processing, but may write one final answer for the problem they're working on at the stop signal. Students must answer questions in order. A skipped question counts as a wrong answer.

Students can bring up to two calculators to use in the contest, provided they meet certain criteria. Calculators must:
 Be commercially available models (models once available, but later discontinued remain eligible)
 Be hand-held, operate silently, and operate without external power (rechargeable batteries are permitted but must be charged prior to competition)

For a question to score as correct, the student must answer it to the third significant digit—with allowable error in the third digit of plus or minus one, except for integer, dollar sign, and certain stated problems that require least significant digits.
For integer problems to score as correct, the student must provide the exact answer (no allowable error) and must give the answer in integer format (decimal points and scientific notation are scored as incorrect).
For dollar sign problems to score as correct, the student must answer the question to the nearest cent, with allowable error of plus or minus one cent, and must use decimal points and cents.
For stated problems that use inexact numbers, correct answers require the method of least significant digits, with allowable error of plus or minus one in the last significant digit.

Five points are awarded for each correct answer, and two points are deducted for each wrong or skipped answer. However, questions not answered beyond the last attempted answer (defined as any problem where a mark or erasure exists in the answer blank for that problem) are not scored. In addition, at the high school level only, 3 points are given on stated problems involving inexact numbers that are answered correctly but with the incorrect number of significant digits, provided at least two significant digits are indicated and the more precise answer rounds exactly to the lesser precise answer.

Determining the winner

Elementary and junior high 
Scoring is posted for only the top six individual places and the top three teams.

There are no tiebreakers for either individual or team competition.

High school level 
The top three individuals and the top team (determined based on the scores of the top three individuals) will advance to the next round. In addition, within each region, the highest-scoring second place team from all district competitions advances as the "wild card" to regional competition (provided the team has four members), and within the state, the highest-scoring second place team from all regional competitions advances as the wild card to the state competition. Members of advancing teams who did not place individually remain eligible to compete for individual awards at higher levels.

For individual competition, the tiebreaker is points on stated or geometric problems. Scoring for these problems, for tiebreaker purposes, is the same as for overall except no points are deducted for incorrect answers. In the event a tie remains, all remaining individuals will advance.

For team competition, the score of the fourth-place individual is used as the tiebreaker. If a team has only three members it is not eligible to participate in the tiebreaker. If the fourth-place score still results in a tie, the individual tiebreaker rules will not apply, and all remaining tied teams will advance. At the state level ties for first place are not broken.

For district meet academic championship and district meet sweepstakes awards, points are awarded to the school as follows:
Individual places: 1st--15, 2nd--12, 3rd--10, 4th--8, 5th--6, and 6th--4.
Team places: 1st--10 and 2nd--5.
The maximum number of points a school can earn in Calculator Applications is 37.

List of past winners

Individual 
NOTE: For privacy reasons, only the winning school is shown.

Team 
NOTE: UIL did not recognize a team championship in this event until the 1988-89 scholastic year.

References 

Official UIL Rules for Calculator Applications--High School NOTE: This file contains rules for other competitions; Section 924 covers Calculator Applications.
Official UIL Rules for Calculator Applications--Junior High School

University Interscholastic League